Brett Nelson (born 1969) is an American multi-instrumentalist, singer and songwriter

Brett Nelson is also the name of:

Brett Nelson (basketball) (born 1980), 1980) American college basketball coach and former player
Brett Nelson (EastEnders), British soap opera character